Buus is a surname. Notable people with the surname include:

Eva Louise Buus (born 1979), Danish artist
Jacob Buus (born 1997), Danish footballer
Jacques Buus ( 1500–1565), Franco-Flemish composer and organist

See Also
Buus